

Eugen Ott (20 May 1890 – 11 August 1966) was a German general in the Wehrmacht during World War II who commanded several corps. He was a recipient of the Knight's Cross of the Iron Cross of Nazi Germany.

Awards and decorations

 Knight's Cross of the Iron Cross on 25 December 1942 as General der Infanterie and commander of LII. Armeekorps

See also

 Jabłonków Incident

References

Citations

Bibliography

 

1890 births
1966 deaths
German Army generals of World War II
Generals of Infantry (Wehrmacht)
German Army personnel of World War I
Recipients of the Knight's Cross of the Iron Cross
People from Sinzig
People from the Rhine Province
Recipients of the clasp to the Iron Cross, 1st class
Reichswehr personnel
Military personnel from Rhineland-Palatinate